Yelena Anokhina (born 17 January 1947) is a Soviet diver. She competed at the 1964 Summer Olympics and the 1968 Summer Olympics.

References

External links
 

1947 births
Living people
Russian female divers
Soviet female divers
Olympic divers of the Soviet Union
Divers at the 1964 Summer Olympics
Divers at the 1968 Summer Olympics
Divers from Moscow